Christopher Columbus is a television miniseries broadcast in Italy and the United States in 1985. In six hours, the series told the story of the life of Christopher Columbus, with Gabriel Byrne starring as the explorer.

Cast

 Gabriel Byrne as Christopher Columbus
 Rossano Brazzi as Diogo Ortiz de Villegas
 Virna Lisi as Dona Moniz Perestrello 
 Oliver Reed as Martin Pinzon
 Raf Vallone as Joseph Vecinho 
 Max von Sydow as John II of Portugal
 Eli Wallach as Hernando de Talavera
 Nicol Williamson as Ferdinand II of Aragon
 Faye Dunaway as Isabella I of Castile
 Michel Auclair as Luis de Santángel

 William Berger as  Francisco de Bobadilla
 Keith Buckley as De Torres
 Mark Buffery as  Bartholomew Columbus
 Anne Canovas as  Beatriz Enriquez
 Elpidia Carrillo as  Coana
 Massimo Girotti as  Duke of Medinaceli
 Larry Lamb as Don Castillo 
 Stefano Madia as  Federico
 Audrey Matson as Dona Felipa Perestrello 
 Murray Melvin as  Padre Linares 

 Jack Watson as  Padre Marchena  
 Patrick Bauchau as  Don Rodrigo
 Salvatore Borgese as  Juan 
 Scott Coffey as  Vallejo
 Cyrus Elias as Alaminos 
 Francesco Lattuada as De Triana 
 Iris Peynado as  Selina 
 Erik Schumann as  Benguela 
 Gregory Snegoff as Francisco Pinzon
 Hal Yamanouchi as Guacanabo

References

External links
 

1985 films
1985 television films
1980s American television miniseries
1980s Italian television miniseries
Italian biographical films
Italian television films
American biographical series
American television films
French television films
West German films
German television films
Das Erste original programming
Films directed by Alberto Lattuada
Films scored by Riz Ortolani
CBS network films
RAI original programming
Television series set in the 15th century
Films set in the 1490s
Films based on non-fiction books
Cultural depictions of Christopher Columbus
Cultural depictions of Isabella I of Castile
Ferdinand II of Aragon
1980s Italian films